Washington County (standard abbreviation: WS) is a county located in the U.S. state of Kansas. As of the 2020 census, the county population was 5,530. Its county seat and largest city is Washington.

History

Early history

For millennia, the Great Plains of North America was inhabited by nomadic Native Americans. Numerous tribes lived on the Great Plains including the: Arapaho, Cheyenne, Comanche, Sioux, Ute, Otoe, Kansa, Kiowa, Osage, Omaha, Ponca, Pawnee, and Wichita. These tribes were sustained by a seemingly inexhaustible supply of buffalo that then numbered in the tens of millions.
  
From the 16th century to 18th century, the Kingdom of France claimed ownership of large parts of North America. In 1762, after the French and Indian War, France secretly ceded New France to Spain, per the Treaty of Fontainebleau.

19th century
In 1802, Spain returned most of the land to France, but keeping title to about 7,500 square miles.  In 1803, most of the land for modern day Kansas was acquired by the United States from France as part of the 828,000 square mile Louisiana Purchase for 2.83 cents per acre.

In 1854, the Kansas Territory was organized, then in 1861 Kansas became the 34th U.S. state.  In 1857, Washington County was established. The Oregon-California Trail, the Overland Stage Line, and the Pony Express all ran through Washington County. The Hollenberg Way Station opened in 1857 and operated until 1872 in the northeast corner of the county.

21st century
In 2010, the Keystone-Cushing Pipeline (Phase II) was constructed north to south through Washington County, with much concern over tax exemption and environmental issues when a leak occurs. The pipeline was shutdown on December 7, 2022, after a leak was detected near the community of Washington. It reopened on December 29, 2022.

Geography

Adjacent counties

 Jefferson County, Nebraska (north)
 Gage County, Nebraska (northeast)
 Marshall County (east)
 Riley County (southeast)
 Clay County (south)
 Cloud County (southwest)
 Republic County (west)
 Thayer County, Nebraska (northwest)

Demographics

As of the census of 2000, there were 6,483 people, 2,673 households, and 1,780 families residing in the county.  The population density was 7 people per square mile (3/km2).  There were 3,142 housing units at an average density of 4 per square mile (1/km2).  The racial makeup of the county was 98.90% White, 0.11% Black or African American, 0.34% Native American, 0.05% Asian, 0.09% from other races, and 0.51% from two or more races.  0.65% of the population were Hispanic or Latino of any race.

There were 2,673 households, out of which 26.60% had children under the age of 18 living with them, 59.40% were married couples living together, 4.20% had a female householder with no husband present, and 33.40% were non-families. 31.20% of all households were made up of individuals, and 17.80% had someone living alone who was 65 years of age or older.  The average household size was 2.35 and the average family size was 2.96.

In the county, the population was spread out, with 23.70% under the age of 18, 5.40% from 18 to 24, 22.90% from 25 to 44, 23.00% from 45 to 64, and 25.10% who were 65 years of age or older.  The median age was 44 years. For every 100 females there were 100.80 males.  For every 100 females age 18 and over, there were 97.80 males.

The median income for a household in the county was $29,363, and the median income for a family was $37,260. Males had a median income of $25,074 versus $18,000 for females. The per capita income for the county was $15,515.  About 7.30% of families and 10.10% of the population were below the poverty line, including 12.20% of those under age 18 and 12.40% of those age 65 or over.

Government

Presidential elections

Washington County is overwhelmingly Republican. No Democratic presidential candidate has won Washington County since Franklin D. Roosevelt in 1932, and Roosevelt remains the solitary Democrat to ever win a majority in the county. Since 1940 only Lyndon Johnson in 1964 has reached forty percent of Washington County's vote for the Democratic Party.

Laws
Washington County was a prohibition, or "dry", county until the Kansas Constitution was amended in 1986 and voters approved the sale of alcoholic liquor by the individual drink with a 30 percent food sales requirement.

Education 
The county is served by:
 Washington County USD 108
 Barnes-Hanover-Linn USD 223

School district office in neighboring county
 Clifton-Clyde USD 224

Communities

Cities

 Barnes
 Clifton (partly in Clay County)
 Greenleaf
 Haddam
 Hanover
 Hollenberg
 Linn
 Mahaska
 Morrowville
 Palmer
 Vining (partly in Clay County)
 Washington

Unincorporated communities
 Lanham (partly in Gage County, Nebraska)

Ghost towns
 Hopewell

Townships
Washington County is divided into twenty-five townships.  The city of Washington is considered governmentally independent and is excluded from the census figures for the townships.  In the following table, the population center is the largest city (or cities) included in that township's population total, if it is of a significant size.

See also

References

Further reading

 70th Anniversary Edition Supplement; Washington County Register; 88 pages; September 16, 1938.
 Plat Book of Washington County, Kansas; Brown-Scoville Publishing Co; 81 pages; 1906.
 Historical Plat Book of Washington County, Kansas; J.S. Bird; 90 pages; 1882.

External links

County
 
 Washington County - Directory of Public Officials
Maps
 Washington County Maps: Current, Historic, KDOT
 Kansas Highway Maps: Current, Historic, KDOT
 Kansas Railroad Maps: Current, 1996, 1915, KDOT and Kansas Historical Society

 
Kansas counties
1857 establishments in Kansas Territory
Populated places established in 1857